Pat & Mat (Czech and Slovak: Pat a Mat) is a Czechoslovak slapstick stop-motion animated series created by Lubomír Beneš and Vladimír Jiránek. The characters first appeared in the theatrically released short Kuťáci (Tinkers) in 1976, while the first made-for-TV episode Tapety (Wallpaper) was produced for ČST Bratislava three years later. The main characters of the series are two handymen, Pat and Mat, who are inventive, but extremely clumsy. , 129 episodes of the show have been released, and it has been syndicated in a large number of countries due to its lack of dialogue.

Names 
The original name of the series was Kuťáci (The Tinkers). However, when production of episodes started for ČST Bratislava, a Slovak name was required, and the crew eventually settled for ... a je to! (... and it's done!). The characters themselves were nameless until 1989, when they were given the names Pat and Mat. Pat and Mat are shortened forms of Czech expressions Patlal and Matlal, which can roughly be translated as Clumsy and Awkward. The authors intentionally gave the characters short and universal names suitable for a worldwide audience.

The show 
Each episode typically features the two characters facing mostly self-made problems, and trying to solve them using a range of possible and impossible tools and construction gadgets. Their solutions appear to work, before everything suddenly goes wrong, leading to even more problems than before. However, Pat and Mat invariably find a solution in the end, usually via a surprising or innovative method. They then shake hands, before making their trademark hand gesture with a bent hand and closed fist.

According to the authors, it is manual ineptitude that inspires the stories. Alongside the humour, another motif of the show is the importance of an optimistic approach towards life. The two characters always get into problematic situations, but they never give up until they solve the problem in imaginative ways.

The show is also memorable for its soundtrack, composed by Petr Skoumal, of which the main parts are the theme song and a harmonica tune.

History 
The two characters first appeared in a 1976 short film entitled Kuťáci (Tinkers) produced by Krátký film Prague (cs)'s Jiří Trnka Studio and distributed by Ústřední půjčovna filmů (cs). While creating the two characters, the authors had in mind entertainment for adults, and the short was shown before movies. Although they intended to produce more shorts for theatrical release, their parent studio refused. The series was picked up by ČST Bratislava's children's section, where it was named ... a je to! (... and that's it!). The two handymen got their names Pat and Mat in 1989, when production was resumed for Krátký film Prague. Their names then also became the name of the show.

As a result of its lack of dialogue, the show was syndicated around the world, being broadcast in more than 80 countries by the 1990s, which included Czechoslovakia (now the Czech Republic and Slovakia), Yugoslavia (now Bosnia and Herzegovina, Croatia, Montenegro, North Macedonia, Serbia and Slovenia), Sweden, Syria, Iraq, Poland, Iceland, Denmark, Germany, Estonia, Austria, Switzerland, Brazil, Romania, Finland, Japan, Norway, Spain, France, Iran, Hungary, Jordan, South Africa, and South Korea. In the Netherlands, the characters are given dubbed dialogue, and are voiced by Kees Prins and Siem van Leeuwen. In Australia the show aired as part of a weekly, half-hour collection of animated shorts on the SBS show Kaleidoscope.

In 1990, after the collapse of the communist regime, Beneš and Jiránek founded their own aiF Studio in Prague (production) and Zürich (marketing, sales, financing), where they produced 14 more episodes, and released all 49 of them to the international market.

In 1999, four years after Beneš's death, his studio went into bankruptcy, leading to a copyright dispute over the characters and the 50th episode, which was therefore never released. Beneš's son Marek founded his own studio, Patmat, in 2001. Production of episodes was resumed in 2002 by Ateliéry Bonton Zlín, resulting in 28 episodes being produced by three studios (Ateliéry Bonton, Anima and Patmat) in just three years. Many crew members were veterans who had worked on the original TV series.

The characters were revived once again in 2009 by Beneš for a new series, Pat a Mat na venkově (Pat & Mat in the Country). The pilot, Postele (Beds), premiered at the 50th Zlín Film Festival in 2010. 12 more episodes followed between 2011 and 2015, produced by Patmat Film and filmed in 16:9. Beneš directed and wrote all 13 episodes. Eight of the episodes were released on DVD in 2013 and received their TV premiere on the Dutch channel VPRO on 9 June 2013, with the rest following soon.

To celebrate the show's 40th anniversary, Gusto Entertainment announced in December 2015 that a full-length feature film would be released in cinemas in 2016. The movie, Pat a Mat ve filmu (Pat & Mat in a Movie), featured seven of the 2009-2015 episodes with linking segments and was shown in cinemas in 2016 in several countries, including the Netherlands. Three more feature films, all collections of several episodes with linking segments, followed in 2018 and 2019.

From 2018 to 2020, 39 new episodes divided into three 13-part series were made in Patmat film, co-produced by Czech Television and Netherlands-based JUST Productions, again directed by Beneš. The animation for more than half of these episodes was produced in a Chinese studio to speed up work.

Unreleased 50th episode 
The 50th episode Playing Cards, started in 1997 and completed in 1998 by some members of the original aiF Studio, was to be the beginning of a new format of the show. It was directed, animated and written by František Váša, and unlike earlier episodes, it was filmed in the widescreen format (16:9), with new opening and closing sequences and soundtrack. The episode was originally produced as a standard 8-minute episode, but an attempt to break into the USA market made the production team extend its length (to 12 and a half minutes), and add English dialogue. The characters were voiced by Czech actors David Nykl and Peter Alton. The episode was only dubbed in English, while the silent version was abandoned.

The studio's original plan was to make further episodes of the new series, with the possibility of half-hour episodes and a feature film in the future. However, these projects were never realised due to the studio's bankruptcy and closure, which was a result of a breakdown of relations between members of the studio's management, together with the authors' heirs. Their disputes had arisen when the 14 episodes produced by aiF Studio beforehand were distributed to South Korea, while, according to Jiránek and Beneš's heirs, the authors did not receive relevant compensation for the sale. Another dispute regarding distribution rights took place in Prague, with the members of the studio unable to come to an agreement. Eventually, the Zürich management member and worldwide distributor terminated all contacts to his former colleagues in Prague. Lubomir Beneš had died in 1995 and the remaining aiF Studio management could not obtain the rights to the characters because of their disputes with his heirs. Due to these circumstances, Playing Cards has never been released or distributed in the Czech Republic and most of the world, even though it entered competition at Annecy in 1999. The studio declared bankruptcy in the same year and was finally liquidated in 2012.

Although the episode was pulled from distribution, a screenshot from it was posted on aiF Studio's website. The former Prague management later set up a new studio at the same location, animation people, and posted more screenshots on their website, which were eventually replaced with a short, silent clip of the episode.  The episode was uploaded to YouTube in 2014, sourced from a South Korean VHS released by aiF's sister company aiF Asia in October 2002, which remains the only known instance of the episode being released on home video. It was released with English subtitles and removed opening and closing titles. The intro sequence was uploaded in 2020 from the same source. With aiF's liquidation in 2012, the episode was transferred to the Czech Film Archive.

Awards 
-Several Pat & Mat episodes have received prizes and awards at international animation festivals.-

The 38th episode The Cyclists, directed by Lubomír Beneš and animated by Alfons Mensdorff-Pouilly, participated in the "Annecy '93" (Annecy, France) animation festival competition, and was invited to a number of other world festivals. The episode was also included in the selection "The Best of Annecy '93" by Cinémathèque Québécoise (Montreal), Museum of Fine Arts (Boston), Pacific Film Archive (Berkeley), Museum of Modern Art (New York City) and presented by these institutions in their autumn 1993 show.

The 44th episode The Billiards, animated by František Váša, was selected for the "Annecy '95" competition, and invited to many other international film festivals. The episode was awarded two prizes at the World Animation Celebration in Agoura, California in March 1997:
 1st prize – best animation for a daytime TV series
 2nd prize – best stop motion professional animation.

The 50th episode Playing Cards (originally named Karty) written, animated and directed by František Váša, was selected for the "Annecy '99" TV competition.

Censorship

Czechoslovakia 
Although intended to avoid politics completely, the original short, Kuťáci, drew the ire of Communist censors in Prague. The short was also screened abroad, where someone objected that the colours of the shirts, red and yellow, were chosen to make fun of the tense Soviet-Chinese relations, with red representing the USSR and yellow China. The authors were so forced to change Mat's shirt from red to a neutral grey until 1989, when the Communist regime collapsed and it was safe to make Mat's shirt red again. Although the authors wanted to continue shooting after the initial short, their studio Krátký film did not allow them to do so. The reason given was that Kuťáci were just ordinary entertainment not appropriate for the cultural policy of the time. However, as the Slovak Television in Bratislava showed interest in further episodes, twenty-eight episodes were produced for them instead, with great success. The series returned to Prague in 1989.

Switzerland 
In Switzerland, the children's television programmers of the German-language station Schweizer Fernsehen banned some of the episodes because they contained high amounts of slapstick violence, which they deemed "too dangerous". The French - and Italian - language channels broadcast the offending episodes as normal.

Fox Kids airings 
In 2003 Fox Kids Europe bought the rights from Ateliéry Bonton Zlín to air episodes 2–26 on the Fox Kids network in several countries, including the Czech Republic, Slovakia, Poland, Hungary, Germany, Greece, Portugal and Brazil. The show had its intro and outro changed and almost all scenes in which the characters use knives or which contain slapstick violence deemed too "intense" were cut. Later airings left the original intro back in, but replaced the outro with a narration warning against imitating the behavior of the series characters.

Iran 
In November 2008, on IRIB TV2, an accidental broadcast of an uncensored version of the episode Vinári in which the main characters are making wine and later consuming it, led to the dismissal of three employees of Iranian television. in July 2020, it happened once again on the Qom provincial network. In a statement, the public relations of Qom Central Radio and Television apologized for the broadcast of this animation and announced that in order to compensate for this mistake, the agents who inadvertently did so were reprimanded by the director general of the center. All airings of episodes such as Modeláři, Klič, Strecha, Pračka, Kolečka and Vinári on IRIB Nahal And TeleWebion have been modified, to remove or alter scenes showing wine while scenes in Pračka featuring a statue of a nude man have it blurred out.

Middle East 
Despite being popularized by the Jordan Television Network under the original name "Zingo wa Ringo", becoming a cultural reference point for many children growing up in the 90s across the Middle East, several Islamic television stations in the Middle East, namely Saudi Arabia, broadcast a heavily edited version of the series under the name "سويلم و عبيد (Sawilem and Obaid)". This version of the series features a completely redone intro and outro alongside other major changes such as completely removing Petr Skoumal's soundtrack, preserving sound effects only where they were not accompanied by music whilst recreating them otherwise, a narrator, and the addition of full voice acting for both characters. This dub sports a censored version of the episode Vinári which cuts the episode's ending, to omit a scene in which both main characters are seen consuming wine.

Production years

List of episodes

Feature films

Broadcast

Titles in other languages 
In alphabetic order:
{| class="wikitable"
|-
! Language(s)
! Title(s)
|-
| Arabic
| "هذا هو... هو كذلك" (This is..it; in Lebanon), "زينغو و رينغو" (Zingo and Ringo), "سويلم و عبيد" (Sawilem and Obaid; in Saudi Arabia)
|- 
| Catalan
| "En Pat i en Mat"
|-
| Chinese
| "大笨蛋和小傻瓜" (Big fool and little fool; in China), 派特和麦特 (in Taiwan), 呆瓜兄弟 (Dumb brothers; in Hong Kong), "得意朋友" (Proud friends; in Singapore)
|-
| Croatian
| "A je to! (I to je to!) Pat i Mat"
|-
| Danish
| "Naboerne Per & Mads (The Neighbors Per & Mads)"
|-
| Dutch*
| "Buurman en Buurman" (Neighbour and Neighbour), formerly "De twee stuntels" (The two klutzes)
|-
| English
| "Pat and Mat"
|-
| Estonian
| "Meistrimehed Pat ja Mat" (Handymen Pat and Mat)
|-
| Filipino
| "Ito Si Pat at Mat" (This Is Pat and Mat)
|-
| Finnish
| "Hupsis!, Pat ja Mat" (Oops!, Pat and Mat)
|-
| German
| "... und fertig!" (... and that's it!), "Pat und Mat", "Peter und Paul", "Sepp und Heiri" (in Switzerland), "Mack und Macke (in DDR)
|-
| Hungarian
| "Kétbalkezesek" (Fumblers) (literally "2 Left Handers"), Pat és Mat|-
| Icelandic
| "Klaufabárðarnir" (The clumsy guys)
|-
| Indonesian
| "Pat dan Mat"
|-
| Japanese
| "パットとマット"
|-
| Korean
| "패트와 매트"
|-
| Latvian
| "Pat un Mat"
|-
| Macedonian
| "Пат и Мат"
|-
| Malay
| "Pat dan Mat"
|-
| Norwegian
| "To gode naboer" (Two Good Neighbours), "Pat og Mat"
|-
| Persian
| "!همینه " (That's it!) also "پت و مت" (Pat & Mat)
|-
| Polish
| "Sąsiedzi (The Neighbours), Pat i Mat"
|-
| Portuguese
| "Zeca e Joca", "Pat e Mat"
|-
| Romanian
| "Asta e! Pat și Mat"
|-
| Russian
| "Тяпа и Ляпа" (Tyapa and Lyapa), "Пат и Мат", "Соседи" (Neighbours)
|-
| Slovenian
| "A je to! Pat in Mat"
|-
| South-Africa
| "Hans en Mans"
|-
| Spanish
| "Los Chapuceros", "Pat y Mat"
|-
| Swedish
| "Två snubbar" (Two dudes), "Pat och Mat"
|-
| Turkish
| "Pat ve Mat"
|-
| Welsh
| "Now a Ned", "Pat a Mat"
|-
! colspan="2"| * In the Dutch version the characters talk, whereas in the original and all other countries there is no dialogue.
|-
|}

 Home media 
After being released on VHS for ten years, the first 35 episodes were released on DVD in the early 2000s, with the 28 new episodes featuring in the last release in 2005. Shorts from the AIF era were initially unavailable because of copyright issues,
but appeared on DVD for the first time in 2007.

 English dub 
In 1999, AIF Asia located in South Korea dubbed Pat & Mat episodes in English for educational purposes. The dub, covering episodes 1 to 49, was originally released on 10 VHS tapes, and re-released in 2003 for 10 DVD discs.

 Related products 
At least two books with the series' characters have been published:

A Czech computer development company, Centauri Production released the Pat & Mat'' mini video game. It was released in Czech language in the Czech Republic on 1 October 2009, and in other EU countries in English in 2010. The English version from Steam was taken down in July 2020.

There is a wide range of Pat & Mat merchandise available, including games, dolls, key rings, office material, posters and T-shirts. In Dutch supermarkets Pat & Mat food is also available.

References

External links 

Official website of Lubomír Beneš' aiF Studio
Official website of Patmat film studio
Pat & Mat fansite
Official website of the Pat & Mat video game

Czech animated television series
Stop-motion animated television series
Television duos
1976 Czechoslovak television series debuts
Czechoslovak television series
Czech children's television series
1970s Czechoslovak television series
1980s Czechoslovak television series
1990s Czech television series
2000s Czech television series
2010s Czech television series
2020s Czech television series
Television shows adapted into novels
Television shows adapted into video games
Fictional Czech people
Fictional inventors
Fictional construction workers
Fictional mechanics
Fictional plumbers
Animated television series without speech
Fictional duos
Czechoslovak Television original programming